This is a complete list of operational, offshore wind farms in the Baltic Sea and connected areas such as Kattegat and Danish straits.

This information is gathered from multiple Internet sources, and primarily the 4C Offshore's Global Offshore Wind Farm Map and Database and is current up to February 2015. The name of the Wind Farm is the name used by the Energy Company when referring to the Farm and is usually related to a shoal or the name of the nearest town on shore. The Wind Farm part is implied and hence removed for clarity.

The list is sorted by capacity, but it can be sorted in any way by clicking the symbol >< at the top in each column.

Wind farm home pages

See also

Wind power in Europe
List of wind farms
List of offshore wind farms
Lists of offshore wind farms by country
Lists of offshore wind farms by water area
List of offshore wind farms in the North Sea
Wind power in Denmark
Wind power in Sweden
Wind power in Finland
Wind power in Germany

References

 
Baltic Sea